Lord Byron is an opera in three acts by Virgil Thomson to an original English libretto by Jack Larson, inspired by the historical character Lord Byron.  This was Thomson's third and final opera.  He wrote it on commission from the Ford Foundation for the Metropolitan Opera (Met), but the Met never produced the opera.  The first performance was at Lincoln Center, New York City on  April 20, 1972, by the music department of the Juilliard School with John Houseman as stage director, Gerhard Samuel as the conductor and Alvin Ailey as the choreographer.  A performance of a revised version, by the composer, took place in 1985 with the New York Opera Repertory Theater.<ref>[https://query.nytimes.com/gst/fullpage.html?res=9404E2DC1E38F932A35751C1A963948260 Tim Page, "Revised Lord Byron Returns".  New York Times, 1 December 1985.]</ref>

The composer himself had great affection for this opera.  The premiere production received mixed reviews, with one particularly negative one from Harold C. Schonberg, including this description:

"....a very bland score, distressingly banal (all those waltzes!) and frequently gagglingly cutesy."

The opera has not yet received a full-scale professional production.  Monadnock Music performed the opera in September 1991.

Synopsis
The opera is set in London from 1812 to 1824.

In the nave of Westminster Abbey, Lord Byron's friends, wife and sister have arrived to present a statue of Lord Byron to the Dean of the Abbey, and to lobby for the poet's burial there.  They learn that Byron had written his memoirs, which causes them concern for his reputation.  The statue of Byron arrives, which sets off memories in the minds of Byron's relations and friends.  These include the courtship of Byron with his future wife.  However, the memories also include that Byron committed incest with his half-sister Augusta Leigh and fathered her daughter, which led to Byron's self-exile and Byron's wife insisting that he must never see Augusta again.  While they have not read Byron's own manuscript, their memories cause enough fear that they burn the memoirs.  The Dean of the Abbey arrives, and upon learning that the relatives considered Byron's memoirs unfit for reading, he denies permission to have Byron buried in Westminster Abbey.  At the end of the opera, the shades of the poets in the Abbey's Poets' Corner welcome Byron among them.

Recording
 Koch: Matthew Lord, Jeanne Ommerle, D'Anna Fortunato, Richard Zeller, Richard Johnson, Gregory Mason, Stephen Owen, Adrienne Csgenery, Thomas Woodman, Louisa Jonason, Donald Collup, David Murray, Jorg Westerkemp, Martin Kelley, Ted Whalen, John Holyoke, David Stoneman, Debra Vanderlinde, Marion Dry; Manadnock Festival Orchestra and Chorus; James Bolle, conductor

In addition, excerpts from the opera, called "Five Tenor Songs from Lord Byron''", have been recorded, with the following artists: Martyn Hill, tenor; Budapest Symphony Orchestra; James Bolle, conductor.

References

External links
 Yale University link about the Virgil Thomson Papers, Irving S. Gilmore Music Library 
 History of Opera at Juilliard (has information on Lord Byron)

English-language operas
Operas by Virgil Thomson
Operas
1972 operas
Operas set in the 19th century
Operas set in London
Operas set in England
Operas about writers
Cultural depictions of Lord Byron